The 2009 Valencia Open 500 was a men's tennis tournament played on indoor hard courts. It was the 15th edition of the Open de Tenis Comunidad Valenciana, and was part of the 500 Series of the 2009 ATP Tour. It was held at the Ciutat de les Arts i les Ciències in Valencia, Spain, from 2 November until 8 November 2009. First-seeded Andy Murray won the singles title.

Players

Seeds

 Seeds are based on the rankings of October 26, 2009 and subject to change

Other entrants
The following players received wildcards into the singles main draw:
  Daniel Gimeno-Traver
  Marcel Granollers
  Óscar Hernández

The following players received entry from the qualifying draw:
  Roberto Bautista-Agut
  Alejandro Falla
  Alberto Martín
  Christophe Rochus

Finals

Singles

 Andy Murray defeated  Mikhail Youzhny, 6–3, 6–2
It was Murray's 6th title of the year and 14th of his career.

Doubles

 František Čermák /  Michal Mertiňák defeated  Marcel Granollers /  Tommy Robredo, 6–4, 6–3

References

External links
Official website

 
2009 ATP World Tour
VAl
November 2009 sports events in Europe
2009